

Events

January events
 January 1 – The New Jersey Railroad and Transportation Company opens its route between Trenton and New Brunswick, New Jersey.

March events
 March 4 – William F. Harnden, founder of Harnden and Company, becomes the first person to send an express shipment by rail when he ships an express package from Boston, Massachusetts, to Providence, Rhode Island, on the Boston and Providence Rail Road.
 March 5 – Bristol and Exeter Railway adopts  for its track gauge.
 March 12 – Maine, New Hampshire and Massachusetts Railroad is incorporated in Maine.

April events 
 April 3 – Andover and Haverhill Railroad reorganizes and changes its name for a second time to Boston and Portland Railroad, reflecting plans to extend its line to Portland, Maine.

June events
 June 4 – The London and Southampton Railway is renamed the London and South Western Railway.

August events
 August 12 
 Ulster Railway opened between Belfast and Lisburn, on 6 ft 2 in (1,880 mm) gauge.
 The Birmingham and Derby Junction Railway in England opens.

September events

 September 20 – Official opening of the first railway line in the Netherlands, locomotive De Arend, broad gauge (1945 mm).
 September 24 – The first railway line in the Netherlands, 19 km between Amsterdam and Haarlem, opens for the public.
 September 26 – The Taunus Railway opens its route between the Free City of Frankfurt and Höchst, Duchy of Nassau.

October events
 October 3 – The first railway line in Italy, 7 km between Naples and Portici, opens.
 October 19 – George Bradshaw publishes the world's first collective railway timetable book in Manchester, England.
 October – Eleazer Lord succeeds James G. King for a second term as president of the Erie Railroad.

Births

June births 
 June 24 – Gustavus Franklin Swift, American founder of Swift and Company which pioneered the use of refrigerator cars in late 19th century America (died 1903).

July births 
 July 17 – Ephraim Shay, American inventor of the Shay locomotive (died 1916).
 July 22 – David Moffat, Colorado railroad financier (died 1911).

August births 
 August 20 – Gaston du Bousquet, French steam locomotive designer (died 1910).

December births
 December 8 – Alexander J. Cassatt, president of the Pennsylvania Railroad 1899–1906 (died 1906).

Deaths

References
 Rivanna Chapter, National Railway Historical Society (2005), This Month in Railroad History: March. Retrieved March 30, 2005.